Pioneer Valley Regional School District is a four town regional school district in eastern and central Franklin County, Massachusetts. Grade K-6 elementary schools are located in Bernardston and Northfield, and the single middle/high school for the entire district (Grades 7–12), Pioneer Valley Regional School, is located in Northfield, Massachusetts. The district was initially formed by the four member towns in 1957 to serve grades 7–12, and became a fully regionalized district K-12 district in 1991.  Its administrative offices are housed in Pioneer Valley Regional School at 97 F. Sumner Turner Road, Northfield, Massachusetts.  

Pearl Rhodes Elementary School closed at the conclusion of the 2018–2019 school year due to budget concerns and decreased enrollment. The following year, Warwick Community School, closed due to budget concerns and decreased enrollment. With the closures, only two elementary schools remain in the district.  

The schools are:

 Bernardston: Bernardston Elementary School (K-6, serving the towns of Bernardston and Leyden)
 Northfield: Northfield Elementary School (K-6, serving the towns of Northfield and Warwick ) and Pioneer Valley Regional School (7-12, district-wide)

The District is governed by a 12-member School Committee, with three members elected from each of the four district towns.

Sources
Page from Massachusetts DESE
P.V.R.S.D. Official Website.
NCES- District Directory

School districts in Massachusetts
School districts established in 1957